Yeah, It's That Easy is the third album by G. Love & Special Sauce, released in 1997. Dr. John contributed to the album. "Stepping Stones" was a minor modern rock radio hit.

Critical reception
Entertainment Weekly thought that "songs like 'I-76', a goofball paean to his native Philadelphia, sound less like Ray Charles and more like Ray Stevens." Trouser Press wrote that "the potentially worthy grooves found in the rim-shot soul of 'Lay Down the Law' and the jazzy hip-hop of the title track stretch into monotonous jamband crap that would make Dave Matthews apologize for his thoughtlessness."

The Washington Post determined that "Love is at his best when he allows pop pleasures to shine through the montage of archival roots and hip-hop experiments."

Track listing
All tracks written by G. Love except as noted.
"Stepping Stones" – 4:24
"I-76" (All Fellas Band) – 3:46
"Lay Down the Law" (All Fellas Band) – 5:37
Dedicated to Greg Burgess
"Slipped Away (The Ballad of Lauretha Vaird)" (G. Love, C. Treece) – 4:47
In memory of Lauretha Vaird, an officer slain in the line of duty
"You Shall See" – 4:15
"Take You There" – 3:11
"Willow Tree" – 3:27
"Yeah, It's That Easy" (G. Love, J. Clemens, Fela Kuti no agreement(part2) ) – 5:37
"Recipe" – 3:36
"200 Years" (All Fellas Band) – 2:33
"Making Amends" (G. Love, J. Clemens)  – 4:17
"Pull the Wool" – 9:23
"When We Meet Again" – 4:49

Personnel 
G. Love – Guitar, Harmonica, Vocals
 Jeff "The Houseman" Clemens – Drums, vocals
Jimmy "Jazz" Prescott – acoustic Bass
Dr. John - Hammond organ, piano
King Kane - Bass, backing vocals
 Katman - bass, lead vocals
Jony V - drums
Chuck Treece - drums
 Smiles - vocals
BroDeeva - backing vocals
 Mary Harris - backing vocals
 All Fellas Band - backing vocals, percussion
Mike Tyler - backing vocals
 Jay Davidson - Piano

References

External links
G. Love & Special Sauce Official site

G. Love & Special Sauce albums
1997 albums